Robin Venneman (born ) is a Belgian male track cyclist, representing Belgium at international competitions. He competed at the 2016 UEC European Track Championships in the team sprint event.

References

1993 births
Living people
Belgian male cyclists
Belgian track cyclists
Place of birth missing (living people)